Ahmed Abdulshafi Yacoub Bassey is a leader of one of the factions of the Darfurian rebel group the Sudan Liberation Movement. He overthrew Abdul Wahid al Nur on 25 July 2006.

External links
 "SLM- Bassey renews commitment to Darfur ceasefire accords", Sudan Tribune, 4 October 2006

People of the War in Darfur
Sudanese rebels
Living people
Year of birth missing (living people)
Place of birth missing (living people)
21st-century Sudanese people